Mahalakshmi Dhobi Ghat is an open air laundry place in Mumbai, India. It is located at Mahalaxmi railway station in southern Mumbai, it is also accessible from the Jacob Circle monorail station. The washers, known as dhobis, work in the open to clean clothes and linens from Mumbai's hotels and hospitals. It was constructed in 1890.

The phrase dhobi ghat is used all over India to refer to any place where many washers are present. Inspired by the Mumbai Dhobi Ghat (then Bombay), the British built Dhobi Ghat in Kolkata (then Calcutta) in 1902 and there are other dhobi ghat places all over southern Asia.

Overview
There are rows of open-air concrete wash pens, each fitted with its own flogging stone. Claimed to be the world's largest outdoor laundry, Dhobi Ghat is a very popular attraction among foreign tourists.

It is located next to Mahalaxmi railway station on the Western Railway's Saat Rasta roundabout. It can be easily seen from the flyover bridge of Mahalaxmi station.

The Dhobi Kalyan & Audhyogik Vikas Cooperative Society, the apex body that represents washermen, estimates the annual turnover of the Mahalaxmi Dhobi Ghat at around Rs 100 crore. For 18 to 20 hours each day, over 7,000 people flog, scrub, dye and bleach clothes on concrete wash pens, dry them on ropes, neatly press them and transport the garments to different parts of the city. Over one lakh (100,000) clothes are washed each day. Some of the wealthier dhobis have given up on manual cleaning and have now installed large mechanical washing and drying machines.
The dhobis collect clothes from all corners of the city, from Colaba to Virar. Their biggest clients are neighbourhood laundries, garment dealers, wedding decorators and caterers, and mid-sized hotels and clubs.

Dhobi Ghat garnered a Guinness Book of World Records entry under ‘most people hand-washing clothes at a single location’ in 2011. In 2013, World Records India and World Amazing Records honoured World Record Certificate to Dhobi Kalyan & Audhyogik Vikas Co – op. Society Ltd

The Saat Rasta Project is a proposed Public Space Project along the Bapurao Jagtap Road, connecting Jacob Circle to the Mahalaxmi Railway Station. This public space will  connect to Dhobi Ghat, which is also a major tourist attraction.

Home to the dhobis and their families (around 200 families), the Dhobi Ghat has seen this occupation passed down from one generation to the next. Also known as the Mahalaxmi Dhobi Ghat, it can be viewed easily from the Mahalaxmi Railway station. The best time to visit Dhobi Ghat is early morning and early afternoon. While the dhobis are in action in the morning to take care of the washing load, the early afternoons are an ideal time to see the clothes dry.

See also
 Dhoby Ghaut, Singapore
 Dhoby Ghaut, Penang, Malaysia

References

Buildings and structures in Mumbai
Tourist attractions in Mumbai
Laundry places
Economy of Mumbai
1890 establishments in India